Small Talk is a 1929 Our Gang short comedy film directed by Robert F. McGowan. Produced by Hal Roach and released to theaters by Metro-Goldwyn-Mayer, it was the 86th entry in the Our Gang series to be released, and the first to be made with sound.

Plot
The gang are all orphans, hoping to be adopted by nice families where "spinach is not on the menu". Wheezer, the youngest child, gets adopted by a wealthy couple, while his older sister Mary Ann does not. The gang all comes to visit Wheezer in his new home, setting off an alarm that causes the police and the fire department to come over. At that time, Wheezer's new mother and father decide to adopt Mary Ann as well. The couple's friends all each adopt a child as well; even Farina is adopted by the maid at Wheezer's new home.

Production notes
Small Talk is the first sound entry in the Our Gang series, and the only sound Our Gang film to be three reels, clocking in at 25 minutes. Three additional silent shorts produced before the release of Small Talk—Little Mother, Cat, Dog & Co. and Saturday's Lesson—would be released afterwards. The film was originally part of the Little Rascals television syndication package for the 1950s until the 1980s, when it was dropped from the package over concerns about its length and sound quality.

Cast

The Gang
 Joe Cobb — Joe
 Jean Darling — Jean
 Allen Hoskins — Farina
 Bobby Hutchins — Wheezer
 Mary Ann Jackson — Mary Ann
 Harry Spear — Harry
 Pete the Pup — Himself

Additional cast
 Helen Jerome Eddy — Helen Eddy, Wheezer's new mother
 Edith Fortier — maid
 Pat Harmon — policeman
 Charles McMurphy — police chief
 Lyle Tayo — Mrs. Brown

See also
 Our Gang filmography

References

External links

http://theluckycorner.com/rmt/089.html

1929 films
1929 comedy films
American black-and-white films
Films directed by Robert F. McGowan
Hal Roach Studios short films
Films about adoption
Our Gang films
Films with screenplays by H. M. Walker
1920s American films
1920s English-language films